Events from the year 1948 in art.

Events
 Summer – The art exhibitions at the Venice Biennale are revived, introducing American abstract expressionism to Europe and part of the Peggy Guggenheim Collection to Venice.
 November 8 – COBRA (avant-garde movement) is formed by Karel Appel, Constant, Corneille, Christian Dotremont, Asger Jorn and Joseph Noiret.
 Georges Braque begins work on his Ateliers.
 The Colony Room Club, a private members' drinking club at 41 Dean Street, Soho, London, is founded and presided over by Muriel Belcher; painter Francis Bacon becomes a member the day after it opens, establishing it as a centre for London's alcoholic artistic elite.
 Cadillac introduce the car tailfin, to Frank Hershey's design authorized by Harley Earl.

Awards
 Archibald Prize: William Dobell – Margaret Olley

Works

Paintings
 Otto Dix – Ecce homo with self-likeness behind barbed wire
 Russell Drysdale – The cricketers
 Rudolf Hausner – It's Me!
 Isabel Lambert – Three Fish
 Henri Matisse – The Plum Blossoms
 Barnett Newman – Onement I
 Sidney Nolan – The Abandoned Mine
 Jackson Pollock – No. 5, 1948
 Anne Redpath – Window in Menton
 Constance Stokes – Girl in Red Tights (approx. date)
 Rufino Tamayo – Cazadores de mariposas
 Andrew Wyeth
 Christina's World
 McVey's Barn
 Karl

Sculpture

 Wäinö Aaltonen – Kun ystävyyssuhteet solmitaan
 Joseph Cornell – Untitled (Cockatoo and Corks)
 Jacob Epstein – Lazarus
 Marino Marini – The Angel of the City
 Gerda Sprinchorn – Linnéstaty (modeled 1907)
 Iglica
 Thomas W. Talbot Monument

Graphic works
 M. C. Escher
 Dewdrop (mezzotint)
 Drawing Hands (lithograph)
 Stars (wood engraving)

Births
 January 24 – Machiko Satonaka, Japanese manga artist
 March 9 – Eric Fischl, American painter
 April 14 – Berry Berenson, American model and photographer (d. 2001)
 July 7 – Alison Wilding, English sculptor and academic
 September 20 – Adrian Piper, American conceptual artist
 October 2 – Donna Karan, American fashion designer
 October 8 – Gottfried Helnwein, Austrian fine artist, photographer, installation and performance artist
 November 1 – Bill Woodrow, British sculptor
 November 18 – Ana Mendieta, Cuban American performance artist (d. 1985)
 December 18 – Mimmo Paladino, Italian sculptor, painter and printmaker
 December 26 – Lin Onus, Scottish-Aboriginal Koori artist (d. 1996)
 Full date unknown
 Wolf Erlbruch, German children's book illustrator and writer
 Jonathan Lasker, American abstract painter
 Christopher Makos, American photographer 
 Marilyn Minter, American painter and photographer
 Roberta Smith, American art critic (The New York Times)
 Andrew Stevovich, Austrian-born American painter

Deaths
 January 8 – Kurt Schwitters, German painter, collagist and poet (b. 1887)
 January 21 – Ambrosia Tønnesen, Norwegian sculptor (b. 1859)
 February 23 – Fidus, German illustrator, painter and publisher (b. 1868)
 March 23 – Yevgeniy Abalakov, Soviet sculptor and mountaineer (b. 1907)
 March 24 – Sigrid Hjertén, Swedish modernist painter (b. 1885)
 July 21 – Arshile Gorky, Armenian American painter (b. 1904)
 August – Feliu Elias, Spanish caricaturist and painter (b. 1878)
 September 9 – Ignacy Pieńkowski, Polish painter (b. 1877)
 September 22 – Felicjan Kowarski, Polish painter and sculptor (b. 1885)
 October 17 – Royal Cortissoz, American art critic (b. 1869)
 November 4 – Shinzō Fukuhara, Japanese photographer (b. 1883)
 December 28 – Hakob Gyurjian, Armenian sculptor (b. 1890)
 December 30 – George Ault, American Precisionist painter (b. 1891)
 Date unknown – Hector Hyppolite, Haitian painter (b. 1894)

See also
 1948 in Fine Arts of the Soviet Union

References

 
Years of the 20th century in art
1940s in art